Yerger is a surname.  Notable people with the surname include:

 Edward M. Yerger (1828–1875), American newspaper editor and murderer
 Henry Clay Yerger (1860–1936), American educator
 Mark C. Yerger (1955–2016), American author
 William Yerger (1816–1872), American jurist